Rose Zwi (8 May 1928 – 22 October 2018) was a Mexican-born South African–Australian writer and anti-apartheid activist best known for her work about the immigrants in South Africa.

Biography
Zwi was born in Oaxaca, Mexico, to Jewish refugees from Lithuania who arrived in 1926 from Žagarė, and her family moved to South Africa when she was a young girl. In 1967 Zwi graduated from the University of Witwatersrand (Johannesburg) with a BA (Hons) in English literature. While living in South Africa, she was part of the white anti-apartheid organization Black Sash.

Zwi lived briefly in Israel, but returned to South Africa until 1988 when she relocated to Australia. She became an Australian citizen in 1992 and lived in Sydney, New South Wales. She visited her parents' hometown, Žagarė, in 2006.

Another Year in Africa
Another Year in Africa is set in a fictional town of Mayfontein, near Johannesburg in the late 1930s and early 1940s. The novel is a chronicle of exile, alienation and assimilation centering the Jewish community of Lithuanian descent.

Awards
 1982 – Winner of the Olive Schreiner Prize for Another Year in Africa – a prize for new and emerging writers
 1982 – Mofolo-Plomer Prize for an unpublished novel (The Umbrella Tree)
 1994 – Human Rights and Equal Opportunity Commission Fiction Award for Safe Houses

Works

Death
Zwi died in 2018 in Sydney, at the age of 90.

Bibliography
 Claudia Bathsheba Braude, Contemporary Jewish Writing in South Africa: An Anthology, University of Nebraska, 2001
 Elizabeth le Roux, Publishing against Apartheid South Africa, A Case Study of Ravan Press, Cambridge University Press, 2020

References

Bloomsbury Guide to Women's Literature

1928 births
2018 deaths
South African Jews
Australian people of Lithuanian-Jewish descent
Jewish Australian writers
Mexican Jews
Australian Jews
Naturalised citizens of Australia
South African emigrants to Australia
South African people of Lithuanian-Jewish descent
South African women novelists
People from Oaxaca
Writers from Sydney
20th-century Australian novelists
20th-century Australian women writers
21st-century Australian novelists
21st-century Australian women writers
Mexican emigrants to South Africa
Jewish women writers